C. Bernard Lowe (1885 – after 1914) was an English professional footballer who played in the Football League for Birmingham.

Born in Cradley Heath, Staffordshire, Lowe played Birmingham League football for several years before joining Birmingham City in 1908. A skilful and creative inside forward, he made his debut in the Football League Second Division on 7 November 1908 in a 2–1 win at home to Barnsley. After 17 games in two-and-a-half years, and being played out of his preferred position too often, he returned to non-league football with Darlaston and then with Netherton. Lowe retired from the game during the First World War.

References

1885 births
Year of death missing
People from Cradley Heath
English footballers
Association football forwards
Halesowen Town F.C. players
Birmingham City F.C. players
Darlaston Town F.C. players
English Football League players
Date of birth missing
Place of death missing